The 2014 Giro della Toscana Int. Femminile – Memorial Michela Fanini will be the 20th edition of the Giro della Toscana Int. Femminile – Memorial Michela Fanini, a women's cycling stage race in Italy. It was rated by the UCI as a category 2.2 race (having dropped down from 2.HC the year previously) and will be held between 12 and 14 September 2013.

Stages

Prologue
12 September 2014 – Campi Bisenzio to Campi Bisenzio,

Stage 1
13 September 2014 – Segromigno in Piano to Segromigno in Piano,

Stage 2
13 September 2013 – Lucca to Capannori,

Classification leadership

References

Giro della Toscana Int. Femminile – Memorial Michela Fanini
Giro della Toscana
Giro della Toscana Int. Femminile